The 2015 Players Tour Championship Grand Final was a professional ranking snooker tournament that took place between 24–28 March 2015 at the Montien Riverside Hotel in Bangkok, Thailand. It was the ninth ranking event of the 2014/2015 season.

Barry Hawkins was the defending champion, but he lost 2–4 against Mark King in the last 32.

Joe Perry won his first ranking event by defeating Mark Williams 4–3 in the final.

Prize fund 
The total prize money of the event was raised to £350,000 from the previous year's £300,000. The breakdown of prize money of the event is shown below:

Seeding list
The players competed in 9 minor-ranking tournaments to earn points for the European Tour and Asian Tour Order of Merits. The seeding list of the Finals was based on the combined list from the earnings of both Order of Merits.

Tournament draw

Final

Century breaks

 138  Neil Robertson
 119  Peter Ebdon
 118, 106, 103  Mark Williams
 115  Stephen Maguire
 102  Judd Trump
 101  Mark Allen
 101  Stuart Bingham

References

2015
Finals
2015 in Thai sport
Cue sports competitions in Thailand
Sport in Bangkok